Arthur Price a British manufacturer and distributor of cutlery.

Arthur Price may also refer to:

Arthur Price (bishop) (1678–1752), Church of Ireland Archbishop of Cashel
Arthur Price (footballer) (1892–1954), English footballer
Arthur Price (MP), Member of Parliament for Montgomery
Arthur Price (speedway rider) (born 1946), retired English motorcycle speedway rider
Art Price (born 1962), former linebacker in the National Football League

Price, Arthur